Qiu Le (born 26 February 1983) is a Chinese weightlifter.

Qiu participated in the men's -62 kg class at the 2006 World Weightlifting Championships and won the gold medal, snatching 140 kg and jerking an additional 168 kg for a total of 308 kg.

Qiu competed in the men's -62 kg class at the 2005 World Weightlifting Championships and won the gold medal, snatching 144 kg and jerking 178 kg for a total of 322 kg.

References

Living people
1983 births
Chinese male weightlifters
Place of birth missing (living people)
Asian Games medalists in weightlifting
Weightlifters from Guangxi
Weightlifters at the 2006 Asian Games
Asian Games gold medalists for China
Medalists at the 2006 Asian Games
World Weightlifting Championships medalists
21st-century Chinese people